Zygaenosia fuscimarginalis is a moth in the family Erebidae. It was described by Charles Swinhoe in 1892. It is found in Papua New Guinea.

References

Nudariina
Moths described in 1892
Zygaenosia